The 2001–02 Segunda Liga season was the 12th season of the competition and the 68th season of recognised second-tier football in Portugal.

Overview
The league was contested by 18 teams with Moreirense FC winning the championship and gaining promotion to the Primeira Liga along with Académica Coimbra and Nacional Funchal. At the other end of the table SC Espinho and UD Oliveirense were relegated to the Segunda Divisão and SC Campomaiorense abandoned professional football.

League standings

Footnotes

External links
 Portugal 2001/02 - RSSSF (Jorge Santos, Jan Schoenmakers and Daniel Dalence)
 Portuguese II Liga 2001/2002 - footballzz.co.uk

Liga Portugal 2 seasons
Port
2001–02 in Portuguese football leagues